Darius Anton Perkins (28 October 1964 – 2 January 2019) was an Australian actor. He was the original actor in the role of teenager Scott Robinson in the soap opera Neighbours in 1985 before the role was taken over by Jason Donovan the following year. Perkins also played Charlie in All the Green Year, Gary Samuels in Home and Away, and Ben in All the Rivers Run for which he won a Logie Award. After a lengthy time away from the screen, in 2013 Perkins returned to Neighbours in his first role in more than 19 years as guest character Marty Kranic. Perkins also appeared in two Bollywood films made in Australia.

Career
He started acting during primary school, where Val Lehman was his drama teacher. His first television role was in The Sullivans in 1976. He played Charlie in All the Green Year and played guest roles in Cop Shop, Prisoner, A Country Practice, Carson's Law and  The Flying Doctors. He also played Ben in the HBO miniseries All the Rivers Run in 1983, which earned him the Logie Award for Best Juvenile Performance. This was followed by the role of Scott Robinson in Neighbours. Perkins only appeared as Scott for the show's first year. When the series moved to Network Ten at the start of 1986, Perkins was sacked from the role due to alleged problems with his behaviour on the set, including lateness. He would later state, however, that his contract simply expired and he was not under obligation with Network Ten, after the series had moved from Network Seven. Jason Donovan took over the role and the character remained in the show until 1989.

After leaving Neighbours in 1986, Perkins played Gary Samuels in Home and Away, a new soap opera devised as a rival for Neighbours. He subsequently appeared once again on A Country Practice in the mid-1990s. He also worked behind the scenes, most notably in the art department for the TV series Crashburn. On 10 July 2013, it was announced that Perkins would be returning to Neighbours in the guest role playing Paul Robinson's shady business associate Marty Kranic.

Death
Perkins died from cancer on 2 January 2019, aged 54. Tributes came from his former Neighbours co-star David Clencie (Danny Ramsay) who said, "I am so sad, really devastated to lose my mate. We had this incredible bond. We were mates to the very end." Jason Donovan later stated, "Never met Darius but always had great respect both personally and professionally." Stefan Dennis who played Perkins' former on-screen brother and Neighbours executive producer Jason Herbison also paid tribute to him.

References

External links

1964 births
2019 deaths
Australian male soap opera actors
Logie Award winners